Samuel Berry McKinney (December 28, 1926 – April 7, 2018) was an American Christian pastor and Civil Rights leader. He was the pastor of Mount Zion Baptist Church in Seattle for four decades. He attended the Selma to Montgomery marches in 1965, and he served on the Seattle Human Rights Commission.

Early life
Samuel B. McKinney was born on December 28, 1926, in Flint, Michigan. He grew up in Cleveland, Ohio, where his father, Wade Hampton McKinney, was a pastor.

McKinney graduated from Morehouse College in 1949. He earned a divinity degree from Colgate Rochester Crozer Divinity School in 1952.

Career

McKinney began his ministry in Providence, Rhode Island, where he was the pastor of Olney Street Baptist Church from 1955 to 1958. He moved to Seattle, Washington, where he served as the pastor of Mount Zion Baptist Church from 1958 to 1998, and from 2005 to 2008.

McKinney invited Civil Rights leader Martin Luther King Jr. to Seattle in 1961, and he attended the Selma to Montgomery marches in 1965. He served on the Seattle Human Rights Commission. He was also a co-founder of Liberty Bank, "the first black-owned bank in Seattle."

With Floyd Massey Jr., McKinney co-authored Church Administration in the Black Perspective. According to The Los Angeles Times, " The book outlined the need for strong, charismatic ministers in urban black churches and remains an important reference work in church organization."

Personal life and death
McKinney married Louise Jones; they had two daughters.

McKinney died on April 7, 2018.

Works

References

1926 births
2018 deaths
Writers from Flint, Michigan
Writers from Seattle
Morehouse College alumni
Colgate Rochester Crozer Divinity School alumni
Activists for African-American civil rights
Selma to Montgomery marches